Jeremy Cameron is a former probation officer and British author.

He is most famous for his Nicky Burkett series of stories: Vinnie Got Blown Away, It Was an Accident, Wider Than Walthamstow, Brown Bread in Wengen and Hell on Hoe Street.

It Was An Accident was later turned into a film starring Chiwetel Ejiofor and Thandiwe Newton.

Cameron is currently signed with publishing houses: Hope Road Publishing and L.R. Price Publications.

References 

British crime fiction writers
Year of birth missing (living people)
Living people